The siege of Belgrade in 1690 was the fifth siege of that city, taking place during the Great Turkish War.

Belgrade had been conquered by the Austrians under the elector of Bavaria, Maximilian II Emanuel, on September 6, 1688, after a five-week siege. Only 20 days later, King Louis XIV of France invaded the Rhineland, starting the Nine Years' War. This invasion made the Emperor stop all offensives in the Balkans and redirect the bulk of his army in the East towards the Rhine.  This diversion allowed the Ottomans under Grand vizier Köprülü Fazıl Mustafa Pasha to regroup their army and retake the initiative. In 1690, the Ottomans recaptured Niš and by October 2 they had reached Belgrade.

The siege lasted for only six days, as the Austrians were forced to surrender when their main powder magazine was hit by a Turkish shell and exploded. Belgrade was then captured by the Ottomans.

The Turks would hold the city until the Austrians retook it in the 1717 siege.

Sources 
Dictionary of Battles and Sieges: A-E, by Tony Jaques

Military history of Belgrade
Belgrade
Belgrade
1690 in Europe
Belgrade 1690
Belgrade 1690
17th century in Belgrade